Gudeodiscus anceyi is a species of air-breathing land snail, a terrestrial pulmonate gastropod mollusk in the family Plectopylidae.

Distribution
The distribution of Gudeodiscus anceyi includes Vietnam.

Ecology
It is a ground-dwelling species as all other plectopylid snails in Vietnam.

It co-occur with other plectopylids in Vietnam: with Gudeodiscus francoisi, Gudeodiscus giardi, Gudeodiscus phlyarius, Gudeodiscus emigrans quadrilamellatus and with Gudeodiscus villedaryi. Gudeodiscus fischeri and Gudeodiscus suprafilaris live at geographically close sites to Gudeodiscus anceyi.

References

External links

Plectopylidae
Gastropods described in 1901